Dyakovsky (masculine), Dyakovskaya (feminine), or Dyakovskoye (neuter) is the name of several rural localities in Russia:
Dyakovskoye, Lomovsky Rural Okrug, Rybinsky District, Yaroslavl Oblast, a village in Lomovsky Rural Okrug of Rybinsky District of Yaroslavl Oblast
Dyakovskoye, Nazarovsky Rural Okrug, Rybinsky District, Yaroslavl Oblast, a village in Nazarovsky Rural Okrug of Rybinsky District of Yaroslavl Oblast
Dyakovskaya, Arkhangelsk Oblast, a village in Shonoshsky Selsoviet of Velsky District of Arkhangelsk Oblast
Dyakovskaya, Vologda Oblast, a village in Kharovsky Selsoviet of Kharovsky District of Vologda Oblast